Hinnites is a genus of rock scallops, marine bivalve mollusks in the  family Pectinidae, the scallops.

These mollusks have been recorded as fossils from the Triassic to the Quaternary (from 235.0 to 0.126 Ma). Fossils have been found in the sediments of Algeria, Angola, Tanzania, Ethiopia, South Africa, Oman, Saudi Arabia, United States, Australia and of various European countries.

Description
This genus include scallops with thick shells resembling that of an oyster.

Hinnites is unusual in that, like the extant taxon Crassadoma gigantea, it was free-swimming as a juvenile, but subsequently cemented itself to a hard substrate.

Species
Species within the genus Hinnites include:
 Hinnites corallinus G. B. Sowerby I, 1827
 Hinnites crispus † (Brocchi, 1814)
 Hinnites denticostatus † Klipstein 1843
 Hinnites distortus (da Costa, 1778) 
 Hinnites ercolanianus † Cocconi 1873
 Hinnites granulosus † Klipstein 1843
 Hinnites obliquus † Münster 1841
Species brought into synonymy
 Hinnites cortesyi Defrance 1821: synonym of Hinnites crispus (Brocchi, 1814) †
 Hinnites giganteus (Gray, 1825) (synonym of Crassadoma gigantea)
 Hinnites multirugosus (Gale, 1928): synonym of Crassadoma gigantea (J.E. Gray, 1825)

References

 Vaught, K.C.; Tucker Abbott, R.; Boss, K.J. (1989). A classification of the living Mollusca. American Malacologists: Melbourne. . XII, 195 pp.

Bivalve genera
Pectinidae